The 2019–20 Syrian Premier League season is the 48th since its establishment. This season's league featured one stage. It pitted one group of 14 teams and kicked off on 20 October 2019. Al-Jaish are the defending champions, having won the previous season championship.

The season was suspended in March 2020, due to COVID-19 pandemic in Syria, then resumed in May 2020.

Teams

Stadiums and locations

League table

Results

Notes

References 

Syrian Premier League seasons

Syria
Syrian Premier League, 2020